James Thompson Wilson (15 March 1924 – 16 January 1987), known as Tug Wilson or Jimmy Wilson,  was an English footballer. He was capable of playing as either a half back or a forward.

His father, Andy Wilson, played for Middlesbrough and Chelsea in the 1920s and 1930s, and was a Scottish international.

Although born in Middlesbrough, Wilson started his career in London, as an amateur at Fulham. He later played for Gravesend & Northfleet, Chelsea and Leeds United, before joining Watford in December 1950. Although largely a reserve at Vicarage Road, Wilson amassed 51 starts in all competitions over his seven years at the club, before joining Southend United for the 1957–58 season.

He died on 16 January 1987 in London, aged 62.

References 

1924 births
1987 deaths
Footballers from Middlesbrough
Association football forwards
English footballers
Fulham F.C. players
Ebbsfleet United F.C. players
Chelsea F.C. players
Leeds United F.C. players
Watford F.C. players
Southend United F.C. players
English Football League players
English people of Scottish descent